Tuiti Makitanara (8 August 1874 – 24 June 1932), sometimes known as Sweet MacDonald, was a Māori and United Party Member of Parliament in New Zealand.

Early life and family
Of Rangitāne, Ngāti Kuia, Muaūpoko and Ngāti Apa descent, Makitanara was born at Havelock in 1874. His mother was Rina Puhipuhi Meihana and his father was Teoti MacDonald. Predominantly self-educated, Makitanara began working as a farmer with his father at age 14, and later became a flaxmiller in Marlborough and at Foxton. He married Karaitiana McGregor in about 1889 and the couple had eight children.

Makitanara assisted Elsdon Best and William John Elvy with the collection of Māori history in Marlborough, took an active interest in Māori land issues and education, and assisted with the recruitment of Māori during World War I.

Member of Parliament

Makitanara first stood for Parliament at the 1925 general election as an independent candidate for Southern Maori, finishing second, 16 votes behind the incumbent, Henare Uru, in a field of five.

At the 1928 general election, Makitanara once again stood for the Southern Maori seat, this time as the candidate of the United Party. He tied with the Rātana candidate, Eruera Tirikatene, 198 votes each, but was elected on the casting vote of the returning officer.

Makitanara was re-elected in the 1931 general election, defeating Tirikatene with a majority of 20 votes. However, he died suddenly at Hokio Beach, near Levin, less than seven months later, on 24 June 1932.

References

1874 births
1932 deaths
Rangitāne people
Ngāti Apa ki te Rā Tō people
Ngāti Kuia people
Muaūpoko people
People from Havelock, New Zealand
Unsuccessful candidates in the 1925 New Zealand general election
United Party (New Zealand) MPs
New Zealand MPs for Māori electorates
Members of the New Zealand House of Representatives